Learning & Behavior is a quarterly peer-reviewed scientific journal published by Springer Science+Business Media on behalf of the Psychonomic Society. The journal was established in 1973 as Animal Learning and Behavior, obtaining its current title in 2003. The founding editor-in-chief was Abram Amsel, the current editor is Jonathan Crystal (Indiana University). The journal covers research into fundamental processes underlying learning and behavior in animals (including humans).

Abstracting and indexing 
The journal is abstracted and indexed in:

According to the Journal Citation Reports, the journal has a 2021 impact factor of 1.986.

References

External links 
 

Springer Science+Business Media academic journals
Neuroscience journals
Psychology journals
Quarterly journals
Publications established in 1973
English-language journals